Robert Burrowes, D.D., was an Anglican priest  in Ireland during the second half of the 18th and the first half of the 19th centuries.

Burrowes was educated at Trinity College, Dublin.  He was Rector of Cappagh; Archdeacon of Ferns from 1796 to 1798; then Master of the Royal School at Enniskillen; and Dean of Cork from 1819  until his death in 1841.

References

Deans of Cork
17th-century Irish Anglican priests
18th-century Irish Anglican priests
1841 deaths
Archdeacons of Ferns